Aaren Russell (born 22 August 1991) is an Australian motor-racing driver in the Virgin Australia Supercars Championship.

Career history

Junior formulae
In 2008 and 2009, Russell competed in the NSW Formula Vee championship, a stepping stone taken by several current main series V8 Supercars drivers. After placing 8th in his 2008 rookie season and 2nd in 2009, the Development V8 Supercar Series, the second tier of V8 Supercars racing, became his next target.

Development Series
Russell moved into the Development Series in 2010 with family team Novocastrian Motorsport. His debut year saw him finish 9th in the championship. While he matched this feat in 2013, he would not improve on this championship position until 2014, when he finished 7th. During the 2014 Dunlop Series, Aaren received two round podiums, one at Queensland Raceway and one at Sydney Olympic Park.  In the 2015 Dunlop V8 Supercar Series, Russell moved teams to drive for Paul Morris Motorsport.

Supercars Championship
In 2015, Russell, alongside his brother Drew Russell, competed in the 2015 Supercheap Auto Bathurst 1000 in a wildcard entry run by family team Novocastrian Motorsport. The entry finished 17th and on the lead lap.

In 2016, Russell signed for Erebus Motorsport to drive a Holden VF Commodore in the 2016 International V8 Supercars Championship, which will be his first full-time drive in the main series. This relationship ended after the Townsville round when major sponsor Plus Fitness dropped their support for the team. He then joined Lucas Dumbrell Motorsport to partner Andre Heimgartner in the Pirtek Enduro Cup series.

In 2017, he returned to the Lucas Dumbrell Motorsport team for initially three rounds starting at the Townsville 400, but including the Bathurst 1000 and Newcastle 500. This deal was later extended to include the Sandown 500 and Gold Coast 600.

For 2018 he will run as co-driver to Heimgartner at Nissan Motorsport for the endurance races. He won the co-driver qualifying race at the Sandown 500 after a mid-race hailstorm disrupted the race order. The pairing finished 16th and were the last car on the lead lap at the 2018 Bathurst 1000.

Career results

Complete Supercars Championship results

Complete Bathurst 1000 results

Complete Bathurst 6 Hour results

References

External links
 Official Aaren Russell web site
 Novocastrian Motorsport Official Site
 
 Aaren Russell profile on US Racing Reference

1991 births
Formula Ford drivers
Living people
Supercars Championship drivers
Racing drivers from New South Wales
Sportspeople from Newcastle, New South Wales
People from the Hunter Region
Nismo drivers
Kelly Racing drivers